Priotelus is a genus of birds in the trogon family endemic to Caribbean islands. It contains two species:

References
 American Ornithologists' Union. Check-list of North American Birds - Trogoniformes. Accessed on April 17, 2009.
 BirdLife International 2004.  Priotelus temnurus.   2006 IUCN Red List of Threatened Species.   Downloaded on 28 July 2007.

 
Bird genera
Taxa named by George Robert Gray
Taxonomy articles created by Polbot
Higher-level bird taxa restricted to the West Indies